Léon Walther (2 June 1874 – 2 March 1973) was a French film and stage actor who played on numerous occasions in Sacha Guitry's films and plays.

Filmography 
 1935: Odette / Déchéance by Jacques Houssin – Count Hubert de Clermont-Latour
 1937: The Pearls of the Crown by Sacha Guitry and Christian-Jaque – Anne de Montmorency
 1938: Remontons les Champs-Élysées by Sacha Guitry and Robert Bibal – a lord
 1939: Nine Bachelors by Sacha Guitry – Le maître d'hôtel
 1941: Le fabuleux destin de Désirée Clary by Sacha Guitry – Count Morner
 1941: Madame Sans-Gêne by Roger Richebé – Despréaux
 1941: Ne bougez plus by Pierre Caron – Le grand chambellan
1942:  Prince Charming by Jean Boyer – Count Danrémont
 1942: The Guardian Angel by Jacques de Casembroot – Molignon
 1942: Une étoile au soleil by André Zwoboda – Adalbert de Merlerault
 1943: Donne-moi tes yeux by Sacha Guitry – the physician
 1943: La Malibran by Sacha Guitry
 1943: La vie de plaisir by Albert Valentin – Célestin
 1945: As Long as I Live by Jacques de Baroncelli
 1946: Roger la Honte by André Cayatte – the president of the court
 1946: La femme en rouge by Louis Cuny – Le directeur des beaux-arts
 1947: Le Comédien by Sacha Guitry – Aubril
 1948: The Lame Devil by Sacha Guitry – a physician
 1949: Monseigneur de Roger Richebé – the majordome
 1949: The Treasure of Cantenac by Sacha Guitry
 1951: La Poison by Sacha Guitry – the prosecutor
 1952]: The Call of Destiny by Georges Lacombe – the critic
 1952: The Virtuous Scoundrel by Sacha Guitry – Maître Denisot, le notaire
 1953]: The Earrings of Madame de… by Max Ophüls – L'administrateur
 1953: Royal Affairs in Versailles de Sacha Guitry – Lévêque de Paris
 1954]: Le Comte de Monte-Cristo by Robert Vernay – film shot in two periods – a courtesan
 1954: Napoléon by Sacha Guitry
 1955: If Paris Were Told to Us by Sacha Guitry – the man addressing Beaumarchais

Theatre 
 1942: N'écoutez pas, mesdames ! by Sacha Guitry, directed by the author, Théâtre de la Madeleine
 1950: Harvey de Mary Chase, directed by Marcel Achard, Théâtre Antoine
 1951: Harvey de Mary Chase, directed by Marcel Achard, Théâtre des Célestins
 1952: N'écoutez pas, mesdames ! by Sacha Guitry, directed by the author, Théâtre des Variétés

External links 
 Léon Walther sur Les Archives du spectacle.

French male actors
people from Vaucluse
1874 births
1973 deaths